Tarimichthys edsinicus is a species of ray-finned fish, a stone loach, in the genus Triplophysa, although some authorities place it in the subgebus or genus Tarimichthys. It is found in the Edsin River which flows into the endorheic Juyan Lake.

References

edsinica
Fish described in 2003